Residences of College Park is a skyscraper complex in Toronto, Ontario, Canada. The north and south towers were completed in 2006 and 2008, respectively, and stand  on Bay Street just south of College Street near the historic College Park department store. A third phase of the development, known as Aura opened in 2014, and is the tallest residential building in Canada.

See also
 List of tallest buildings in Toronto
 List of tallest buildings in Canada

References

External links
 official website

Residential skyscrapers in Toronto
Residential buildings completed in 2006
Residential buildings completed in 2008
Postmodern architecture in Canada
Twin towers